Nadeem Khan (Born December 15, 1977; as Mohammad Wasiq Nadeem Khan) is an Indian human rights activist. Khan is the National Secretary of the Association for Protection of Civil Rights (APCR). He is a co-founder of United Against Hate (UAH).

Early life and education 
Nadeem Khan was born in Fatehpur, Uttar Pradesh. He received his primary education in his hometown. Khan's Father Mohammad Wasim Khan was a farmer.

United Against Hate 
Nadeem Khan along with other activists launched United Against Hate (UAH) -an anti-hate crime campaign initiative- in 2017. UAH is a team of professionals, students, social activists, bureaucrats, journalists, and advocates who are endeavoring to help, address the issues, bring in mainstream discussions the cause of victims of hate crime by organizing conferences, protests, workshops across the country.

Awards 

 Janmitr Samman by People's Vigilance Committee on Human Rights (PVCHR).
 National Muslim Social Leadership Award for Civil Liberties by Movement for Empowerment of Muslim Indians (2019).
 Voice of People Award by Pal Pal News.

References 

Indian human rights activists
Living people
1977 births